The Seeing Eye is a 1951 American short documentary film produced by Gordon Hollingshead in Technicolor as a Technicolor Special about The Seeing Eye, a guide dog training school in Morristown, New Jersey. It was nominated for an Academy Award for Best Documentary Short.  The Seeing Eye was preserved by the Academy Film Archive in 2006.

Among previous film short documentaries on the same subject are two other titles sporting the same title:
Also for Warner Brothers, but produced by Jerome Hillman as part of the Broadway Brevities series, running 19 minutes and released April 5, 1941.
Produced by Educational Film Exchanges, Inc., supervised by Clinton Wunder, running 10 minutes and released January 17, 1936 as part of the "Treasure Chest" series.

References

External links

/site includes film in historical timeline

1951 films
1951 documentary films
1951 short films
American short documentary films
1950s short documentary films
Warner Bros. short films
Films shot in New Jersey
Morristown, New Jersey
Documentary films about dogs
Documentary films about blind people
1950s English-language films
1950s American films